Pierre Juvenet (1883–1951) was a French stage and film actor. A character actor, he appeared in more than a hundred films frequently portraying officials and authority figures.

Selected filmography

 The Mystery of the Yellow Room (1930)
 The Night Is Ours (1930)
 Tenderness (1930)
 The Shark (1930)
 The King of Paris (1930)
 Holiday (1931)
 The Marriage of Mademoiselle Beulemans (1932)
 The Blaireau Case (1932)
 The Barber of Seville (1933)
 The Red Robe (1933)
 To Be Loved (1933)
 Toto (1933)
 L'Aventurier (1934)
 The Midnight Prince (1934)
 Fanatisme (1934)
 Divine (1935)
 The Call of Silence (1936)
 Marinella (1936)
 Forty Little Mothers (1936)
 The Pearls of the Crown (1937)
 The Red Dancer (1937)
 Adrienne Lecouvreur (1938)
 Stolen Life (1939)
 The Emigrant (1940)
 Love Around the Clock (1943)
 As Long as I Live (1946)
 Back Streets of Paris (1946)
 Les aventures de Casanova (1947)
 Not Guilty (1947)
 Gigi (1949)
 The Cupid Club (1949)
 The Ladies in the Green Hats (1949)
 The Treasure of Cantenac (1950)

References

Bibliography
 Powrie, Phil & Rebillard, Éric. Pierre Batcheff and stardom in 1920s French cinema. Edinburgh University Press, 2009.

External links

1883 births
1951 deaths
French male stage actors
French male film actors
Male actors from Lyon